Guillaume Boni ( – ) was a French Renaissance composer. Boni was choirmaster at Saint-Étienne Cathedral from 1565 until his death after 1598. Like Anthoine de Bertrand, he was born in Auvergne and working in Toulouse.

Works
 Psalmi Davidici novis concentibus sex vocibus modulati cum oratione Regia 12. voc Paris: Le Roy
 Chansons de Ronsard
His works were known in England since a work of Boni's is the only identifiable foreign work found in the Willmott and Braikenridge manuscripts of Latin church music, 1591.

External links

References

16th-century French composers
French male composers
French composers of sacred music
1530s births
1590s deaths